The Old Mosque, also known as Grand Mosque, is an early 15th-century Ottoman mosque in Edirne, Turkey.

History
It was built from the order of Emir Süleyman, and completed under the rule of his brother, Sultan Mehmet I. The mosque is located in the historical center of the city, near the market and close to other prominent historical mosques, Selimiye Mosque and Üç Şerefeli Mosque. The mosque is covered by 9 domes supported on four columns. The mosque had originally a single minaret, the taller one was later built by Murat II.The mosque without a courtyard is entered through three doors. Inside the mosque large calligraphy works can be seen.

Gallery

See also
 Islamic architecture
 List of mosques
 Ottoman architecture
 List of Turkish Grand Mosques

References 

Eski Camii, Archnet

External links

Photographs of the Eski Camii taken by Dick Osseman

15th-century mosques
Ottoman mosques in Edirne
Mosques in Edirne
Tourist attractions in Edirne
Ottoman architecture in Edirne

Mosque buildings with domes
Mosques completed in 1414